ANS Pivani Bakı FK was an Azerbaijani football club from Baku that played in the Azerbaijan Top Division.

History 
The club was founded in 1992, as Nicat Maştağa and dissolved in 2000 as ANS Pivani Bakı. During their existence they had four name, Nicat Maştağa from 1992 to 1994, then Bakı Fahlasi Maştağa in 1994, Bakı Fahlasi from 1995 to 1999 and then ANS Pivani Bakı in their final season.

They participated in the Azerbaijan Top Division from 1992 to 2000, when they folded due to financial difficulties. Their best finish was 5th, which they achieved three times, '97–98, '98–99 and in their final season '99-00.

League and domestic cup history

European record

Matches

Individual records 
Lists of the players with the most caps and top goalscorers for ANS Pivani Bakı,:

References 

Pivani
Association football clubs established in 1992
Defunct football clubs in Azerbaijan
Association football clubs disestablished in 2000